Pantai Acheh is a coastal village within the city of George Town in the Malaysian state of Penang. It is located within the Southwest Penang Island District, at the western coast of Penang Island between Teluk Bahang to the north and Balik Pulau to the south.

Transportation 
Jalan Pantai Acheh is the main road that runs through the heart of the agricultural village. Rapid Penang bus route 404 is the sole public bus route to Pantai Acheh, linking the village with the town of Balik Pulau.

Education 
Pantai Acheh contains a single primary school - SRJK (C) Chin Hwa.

Infrastructure 
The Sheikh Tahir Jalaluddin Falak Observatory, one of the several Islamic observatories in Malaysia, is situated near the village. It functions as a site for the sighting of the new moon at the start of every fasting month.

References

Southwest Penang Island District
Villages in Penang